Löwe Automobil is a German automotive part manufacturer that specializes in various car sensors. It is a brand of LASPA Berlin.

Products
Löwe Automobil products include mass flow sensors, fuel pressure regulators, oxygen sensors, universal oxygen sensors, idle speed controllers, and throttle position sensors.

BMW and Mercedes-Benz are the main focus of Löwe Automobil's airflow meter production.

Löwe Automobil mass airflow meters are sold all over the world.

Spelling
Because of the German letter "ö" in the word Löwe (German for lion), the company's name is a matter of some confusion — where both Lowe Automobil and Loewe Automobile are acceptable variations of the Anglicized spelling.

References

External links
 Official Website of Löwe Automobil in English
 Official Website of Löwe Automobil in German

Auto parts suppliers of Germany
Manufacturing companies based in Berlin
German brands